Sporting Clube de Nampula, is a football (soccer) club from Nampula, Mozambique, playing in the top division in Mozambican football, Moçambola.

Current squad 

Nampula
Association football clubs established in 1948